Sancassania is a genus of mites in the family Acaridae that contains more than 80 different species.

Species
 Sancassania berlesei (Michael, 1903)
 Sancassania chelone Oudemans, 1916
 Sancassania mironovi Klimov & O'Connor, 2003
 Sancassania mycophaga (Mégnin, 1874)
 Sancassania nesbitti Klimov & O'Connor, 2003
 Sancassania ojibwa Klimov & O'Connor, 2003
 Sancassania oudemansi (Zachvatkin, 1937)
 Sancassania regleri (E. Türk & F. Türk, 1957)
 Sancassania rodionovi (Zachvatkin, 1935)
 Sancassania ultima Samsinak, 1988

References

Acaridae